Euro Truck Simulator 2 is a truck simulator game developed and published by SCS Software for Microsoft Windows, Linux, and macOS and was initially released as open development on 18 October 2012. The game is a direct sequel to the 2008 game Euro Truck Simulator and it is the second video game in the Truck Simulator series. The game is non-linear with basic premise of the game being that the player can drive one of a choice of articulated trucks across a condensed depiction of Europe, picking up cargo from various locations and delivering it. As the game progresses, it is possible for the player to buy more vehicles and depots, as well as hire other drivers to work for them.

The game has sold over 9 million units as of March 2021, according to a press release by Renault Trucks.

Game play 

Euro Truck Simulator 2 is a truck driving simulator with business management elements. Players drive articulated trucks in an open world rendition of Europe, delivering loads to a designated locations in order to be compensated with money and experience points. The payload must be delivered to the destination within a given amount of time, and with the least amount of damage to the goods as possible, in order to get the most money and experience points possible. Players will have to spend money on refuelling, toll costs in certain countries, and maintenance costs if damage is incurred.

When starting out, players choose their headquarters location in any of the game map's cities. At first, the player can only take what is known as quick jobs—these jobs involve making hired driver deliveries while employed by a delivery company, with a provided truck and all expenses (fuel, road tolls, ferry crossings) covered. As the player earns money or takes bank loans, they can eventually afford to buy themselves a truck, acquire a home garage, and start accepting better-paying jobs by using their own truck instead of being a driver for hire with equipment being provided.

Money earned in the game can be spent on upgrading or purchasing new customizable trucks and ownable trailers, hiring non-player character drivers to take on deliveries, buying more garages and expanding them to accommodate more trucks and drivers. The skills of the drivers hired by the player also grow with experience and the player can create a huge fleet of the trucks, each with the option of having their own trailer, and drivers to drive the fleet, in turn, expanding the business across Europe.

The player gains experience points after each delivery. A skill point is awarded after each level-up. Skill points can be used to unlock deliveries that require different ADR classes, longer distance deliveries, special cargo loads, fragile cargo loads, deliveries that are urgent and eco-driving. This progression allows the player to take on better-paying jobs. The base game features 71 cities in twelve countries, over twenty types of cargo and over fifteen fictional European companies. There are seven items of map downloadable content (DLC) that expand the game to more countries and locations, and multiple other truck and trailer DLCs.

Map updates
Excluding downloadable packs, the base game features Austria, Belgium, the Czech Republic, north-eastern France, Germany, northern Italy, Luxembourg, Netherlands, western Poland, Bratislava in Slovakia, Switzerland, and the United Kingdom.

Part of SCS Software's recent development philosophy for Euro Truck Simulator 2, amongst releasing paid downloadable map packs, is to improve old areas of the map. The initial reception from fans and media highlighted that areas such as the UK appeared to be unrealistic.  As the initial game areas were mainly ported from older SCS Software games, these older areas did not stand up to the quality of recent expansion packs. Map updates are free. Early updates included the cities of Venice, Graz and Klagenfurt. 

Update 1.26 included reworked parts of France, parts outside of Vive la France DLC. Update 1.30 prepared existing Italy areas for the Italia DLC. Germany was rebuilt in stages with Travemünde added in version 1.33, with overall  improvements visible in versions 1.32, 1.35, 1.40 with Hannover rebuilt in 1.45. Several French cities received free updates. Update 1.37 brought changes to French cities of Dijon, Metz, Strasbourg and Reims, with reskin of Lille arriving in version 1.38, rebuild of Calais in version 1.39, and the rebuild of Lyon present in version 1.43. An entire rehaul of Austria was released as part of the version 1.44 update in May 2022.

Downloadable content

Map expansion packs 
Euro Truck Simulator 2 offers several downloadable content base map, major expansion packs.

Other expansion packs

SCS Software has released several other minor expansion packs. Euro Truck Simulator 2 can be enhanced with several paint job packs for trucks, ranging from seasonal repaints to nation-themed repaints.

Other expansion packs expand the game with licensed content from real-life manufacturers: Feldbinder Trailer Pack, Krone Trailer Pack, Schwarzmüller Trailer Pack, with additional tire, wheel and truck parts modifications from Goodyear, HS-Schoch and Michelin. In addition, special tuning packs are available for each truck manufacturer besides Iveco and MAN. These packs add more tuning options, ranging from bullbars to branded mugs to all trucks of the selected brand, except for the Renault tuning pack, which only features new tuning parts for the newest Renault Range T truck.

There are several expansion packs that expand the functionality of the game, including Cabin Accessories DLC (which allows players to personalize their truck interiors), and two DLCs that allow transport of heavy cargo: Heavy Cargo DLC and Special Transport DLC (also available for American Truck Simulator; consisting of even heavier cargo that exceed regular cargo regulations with escort vehicles that will help guide the player deliver cargo at short distances). With this DLC, the dynamic is separate from the regular gameplay. Players can take special jobs, during which they cannot make stops at rest areas, gas stations or deviate away from escort vehicles.

Reception 

The game was generally well received by critics, holding a score of 79/100 on Metacritic, indicating "generally favorable reviews".

In a review for Destructoid, Jim Sterling praised the game's accessibility, noting how easy the GPS and map features were to use, as well as the option to stream European internet radio, and the multitude of control options available. They also praised the graphics, stating that "[f]rom the shape of the traffic lights to the atmosphere of the backdrops, there's a sense of individuality to each new territory you uncover, and the trucks themselves are lovingly recreated with an intricate level of detail", although they did criticise the AI of the other vehicles on the road.

In a similarly favourable review, Tim Stone of PC Gamer called it "unexpectedly engrossing", praising the size of the map and the variation of the roads and scenery available. He did however have reservations about the accuracy of the surroundings, commenting "no one seems to have told SCS’s countryside crafters that rural Britain features long green things called hedges. Cities are often depicted with the shortest of visual shorthand – a few warehouses, the odd landmark if you’re lucky."

Rock, Paper, Shotgun listed Euro Truck Simulator 2 ninth on their list of "The 25 Best Simulation Games Ever Made". In 2012, PC Gamer awarded the game with the accolade of "The Sim of The Year 2012".

Ports 
Initially released for Windows and available for purchase and download via SCS's own website, the game was added to Steam in January 2013. Expanding beyond the Windows version, SCS announced in March 2013 that they were developing a Mac version of the game. One month later, they released a Linux beta version of the game to the public through Steam. On 27 February, they stated "the Mac OS port of ETS 2 is taking longer than anybody would like, but trust us, we are still working hard on it." 

On 19 December 2014, SCS Software announced on their blog that the OS X version of the game is ready for a public beta available on Steam. On 21 January 2015, a 64-bit version of Euro Truck Simulator 2 was released, which allows for more memory to be used by the game.

Notes

References

Bibliography

External links 
 
 

2012 video games
Video game sequels
Windows games
Linux games
MacOS games
Oculus Rift games
SCS Software games
Steam Greenlight games
Truck simulation video games
Multiplayer and single-player video games
Video games developed in the Czech Republic
Video games featuring protagonists of selectable gender
Video games set in Austria
Video games set in Belgium
Video games set in Bulgaria
Video games set in the Czech Republic
Video games set in Denmark
Video games set in Estonia
Video games set in France
Video games set in Finland
Video games set in Germany
Video games set in Hungary
Video games set in Italy
Video games set in Latvia
Video games set in Lithuania
Video games set in Luxembourg
Video games set in the Netherlands
Video games set in Norway
Video games set in Poland
Video games set in Portugal
Video games set in Romania
Video games set in Russia
Video games set in Slovakia
Video games set in Spain
Video games set in Sweden
Video games set in Switzerland
Video games set in Turkey
Video games set in the United Kingdom
Video games with Steam Workshop support